Mary Helen Washington (born January 21, 1941, in Cleveland, Ohio) is an African American literary scholar and the author of numerous books on the African-American female experience. She is best known for her influence on increasing representation of Black authors in education and in literary schools of thought. Washington is a past president of the American Studies Association, and an experienced English professor.

Early life 
Mary Helen Washington was born and raised in Cleveland, Ohio. She grew up in a conservative Catholic home during the 1950s Cold War era, and attended Catholic schools throughout her childhood. American Cold War ideologies and reformations in the Catholic Church led by Pope John XXIII heavily influenced her upbringing, but ultimately led her to challenge these views by pursuing Left-wing schools of thought.

Education 
After high school, Washington attended college to study history and African American literature. She earned her undergraduate degree from Notre Dame College and went on to move to Detroit to attend graduate school in the early 1960s. Living in Detroit, Washington felt deeply connected to the Black community and culture, which led her to become involved with the union activities of the Dodge Revolutionary Union Movement (DRUM). Washington received her doctorate degree in 1976 at the University of Detroit, becoming the University's English Department's first Black graduate student.

Career 
After graduating from the University of Detroit, Washington authored many of her books. She also became involved in academia, serving as the Director of Black Studies at the University of Detroit Mercy from 1976 to 1980 and teaching at the University of Massachusetts, Boston, from 1980 to 1990, and the University of Maryland, College Park  in the early 1990s. Washington is a Distinguished Professor at the University of Maryland, College Park in the Department of English. She was elected president of The American Studies Association and was in that position from 1996 to 1997.

Washington’s career as an author established her a staple of African-American literature classes nationwide. She is the author of several books of cultural criticism and literary criticism, including The Other Blacklist: The African American Literary and Cultural Left of the 1950s, and has contributed to the PBS documentary series American Experience.

Influences 
In her book The Other Blacklist, Washington reflects that her anti-communist upbringing triggered her interest in communist theory and its connection to Black literature. In her work, she shows interest in influential female African American authors and artists from the Cold War era, and she explores how Leftist views influenced these authors to pursue Black radicalism and literary scholarship. As a political and social justice activist, Washington writes with the goal of challenging the canon of Afro-American Literature. She uses her scholarship to push for schools to teach material by Black women.

Washington's work often integrates ideas of feminism and communism according to Black female experience. In her essay “Feminist Roots” published in Women's Review of Books, she critically engages with feminism’s relation communism, connecting Black feminist movements to 1930s communist labour initiatives. Washington has written four anthologies, each with different focuses under the broader idea of promoting Black female literature.

As mentioned in Paule Marshall's obituary in The Washington Post, Washington is the biographer of Paule Marshall; the biography is to be published by Yale University Press. Washington praises Marshall for the way "She explored a black woman’s consciousness and broke out of convention," as well as expressing admiration for the importance of Black females writers' "transnational view of the world." Washington focuses on promoting the scholarship of Black authors and challenging the standards for representation in literature.

Works

Notable works

Black-Eyed Susans (1975) and Midnight Birds (1980) 
Black-Eyed Susans is a collection of ten stories meant to challenge the stereotypes of servant, wife and mother associated with Black women. Its collection of characters convey an image of Black women that stresses their complexity and depth.

Five years later, Washington published Midnight Birds as a revision of Black-Eyed Susans that focuses on various aspects of contemporary Black women writers’ experience, exploring issues of poverty, abuse, mental illness and sexuality.

Memories of Kin (1991) 
Memories of Kin is a collection of family-centered stories and poems. It depicts Black families' struggle to uphold traditions from a primarily female viewpoint. The collection explores the way different generations interact within families, especially mother-daughter relations.

The Other Blacklist (2014) 
The Other Blacklist critiques the lack of influential Black literary figures accepted as literary canon. Washington focuses on the lived experiences of influential Left Black literary figures such as Lloyd Brown and Gwendolyn Brooks. Her analysis focuses on archives materials, including interviews and FBI files to push the literary canon to better represent  the role of Black authors in shaping American culture.

Awards 
Washington is the 1988 recipient of the Candace Award from the National Coalition of 100 Black Women and has received honorary Doctorate degrees from Bridgewater State College, Emmanuel College, Notre Dame College, Regis College, and Marygrove College. In 2014 she received an honorable mention for the Modern Language Association's  William Sanders Scarborough Prize. In 2015 she received the American Studies Association's Carl Bode-Norman Holmes Pearson Prize for lifetime achievement.

References

External links
 "Disturbing the Peace: What Happens to American Studies If You Put African American Studies at the Center?", Presidential Address to the American Studies Association, October 29, 1997

1941 births
Living people
University of Maryland, College Park faculty
Women anthologists